The Republic of China (ROC) is divided into two streamlined provinces of Taiwan and Fujian along with six special municipalities. This is a list of townships/cities and districts in statistical order. There are 368 such divisions under its territorial control.

See also
 List of administrative divisions of Taiwan
 List of administrative divisions of Fujian

Notes

References

Subdivisions of Taiwan
Townships, county-administered cities and districts of Taiwan